Myurella reunionensis is a species of sea snail, a marine gastropod mollusk in the family Terebridae, the auger snails.

Description

Distribution
This marine species occurs in the Indian Ocean off Réunion

References

External links
 MNHN, Paris: holotype

Terebridae
Gastropods described in 1985